Anthony Island (Haida: SG̱ang Gwaay) is an island located in the southern part of Haida Gwaii, off the North Coast of British Columbia, Canada, to the west of Kunghit Island, the archipelago's southernmost. Anthony Island is noted for being the location of the ruins of SkungWai or SG̱ang Gwaay Llnaagay, commonly called Ninstints after the reigning mid-19th Century chief there. SG̱ang Gwaay Llnagaay was a major village of the Kunghit Haida people.

Anthony Island is part of the Gwaii Haanas National Park Reserve and Haida Heritage Site. Its Haida name, SG̱ang Gwaay, refers to the wailing sound made when winds push through a hole in the rocks at a certain tide level.

See also 
 List of islands of British Columbia

References

External links 
 Canadian Museum of Civilization webpage on Skungwai/Ninstints

First Nations history in British Columbia
Haida
Islands of Haida Gwaii